"Kings and Queens" is Killing Joke's third single from their fifth studio album, Night Time. It was originally released by E.G. Records on 21 March 1985 as a 7" and 12" single in the UK, and a 7" single by Polydor in the Netherlands. It was produced by Chris Kimsey. Although "Kings and Queens" was overshadowed by the success of Killing Joke's previous single, "Love Like Blood", it did reach number 58 in the UK Singles Chart.

Track listings 
The B-side to the single was a dub remix of the song "Multitudes" from Night Time, titled "The Madding Crowd (Remixed by Killing Joke)". The 12" single featured the dub mix "Kings and Queens (A Right Royal Mix)" as its A-side, with the original included on the B-side.

7" single 
Side A
"Kings and Queens" – 03:35

Side B
"The Madding Crowd (Remixed by Killing Joke)" – 05:05

12" single 
Side A
"Kings and Queens (A Right Royal Mix)" – 04:52

Side B
"The Madding Crowd (Remixed by Killing Joke)" – 05:05
"Kings and Queens" – 03:35

Charts

References

External links 

1985 singles
1984 songs
Killing Joke songs
Music videos directed by Meiert Avis
Songs written by Jaz Coleman
Songs written by Paul Ferguson
Songs written by Geordie Walker
Songs written by Paul Raven (musician)
Song recordings produced by Chris Kimsey
E.G. Records singles
Polydor Records singles